The Arrogant-class cruiser was a class of four protected cruisers built for the British Royal Navy at the end of the 1890s. One ship, was lost following a collision with a merchant ship in 1908, while  saw active service in the First World War, taking part in the Zeebrugge Raid in April 1918 before being sunk as a blockship during the Second Ostend Raid in May 1918.

Design
The 1895–96 programme of naval construction for the Royal Navy included provision for four Second-class cruisers of the Arrogant class. While most contemporary Royal Navy cruisers were intended for trade protection, the Arrogant class was designed to operate with the main battle fleet, finishing off crippled enemy ships by ramming. They were originally described as "Fleet Rams".

To suit the class for its proposed role, the ram bow was larger and stronger than normal.

The ships' main gun armament was a mixture of four  guns and six  guns, and a secondary armament of eight 12-pounder (76 mm) and three 3 pounder (47 mm) guns, supplemented by 5 machine guns and three  torpedo tubes. The Arrogants, like many of the armoured cruisers built for the Royal Navy, were often criticised by the contemporary press, with the 1896 Brassey's Naval Annual considering that the class’s armament and speed were "hardly satisfactory", with unfavourable comparisons made to armoured cruisers being built for export, and ships in service with France and Germany. The ships’ armament was strengthened in 1903–04, when the existing main gun armament was replaced by a homogeneous battery of ten 6 inch guns.

History
The four ships were laid down at Devonport and Portsmouth naval dockyards in 1895–96, launching in 1896–97 and were completed between 1898 and 1900.

 collided with the American liner  in a heavy snowstorm off the Isle of Wight on 25 April 1908, sinking with the loss of 27 men. Although she was raised in October 1908, Gladiator proved too expensive to repair and was sold for scrap.

 became a submarine depot ship in 1911, while  was paid off in 1912, being renamed HMS Forte in 1915, serving as a hulk attached to the stone frigate (or shore establishment) HMS Vernon.  served as a tender attached to HMS Vernon from 1912 until the outbreak of the First World War, when she returned to active service. In 1918, Vindictive was converted to an assault ship for the Zeebrugge Raid on 23 April, and following that was scuttled as a blockship during the Second Ostend Raid on 10 May 1918.

Ships

Notes

Footnotes

References

External links

  Arrogant Class Cruiser

 
Cruiser classes
Ship classes of the Royal Navy